Carlos Antonio Herrera Araluce was a Mexican politician affiliated with the Institutional Revolutionary Party. As of 2014 he served as Deputy of the LIX Legislature of the Mexican Congress representing Durango. He was also Municipal President of Gómez Palacio from 1974 to 1977.

References

Date of birth unknown
Living people
Politicians from Durango
Institutional Revolutionary Party politicians
Municipal presidents in Durango
Year of birth missing (living people)
Members of the Congress of Durango
20th-century Mexican politicians
21st-century Mexican politicians
Deputies of the LIX Legislature of Mexico
Members of the Chamber of Deputies (Mexico) for Durango